The Athletics at the 2016 Summer Paralympics – Men's 100 metres T37 event at the 2016 Paralympic Games took place on 10–11 September 2016, at the Estádio Olímpico João Havelange.

Heats

Heat 1 
11:23 10 September 2016:

Heat 2 
11:31 10 September 2016:

Final 
10:52 11 September 2016:

Notes

Athletics at the 2016 Summer Paralympics
2016 in men's athletics